Linear medium may refer to:

 A material with linear elasticity
 An optical medium that obeys linear optics

See also
Nonlinear medium (disambiguation)